Phryganopsis punctilineata is a moth of the  subfamily Arctiinae. It is found in the Democratic Republic of Congo, Ethiopia, Kenya, South Africa and Uganda.

References

 Natural History Museum Lepidoptera generic names catalog

Lithosiini